Trachonitis is a genus of snout moths. It was described by Philipp Christoph Zeller in 1848.

Species
 Trachonitis capensis Hampson, 1901 (often placed in Flabellobasis)
 Trachonitis cristella (Hübner, 1776) (Europe)
 Trachonitis odilella Legrand, 1966 (from the Seychelles)
 Trachonitis renatella Legrand, 1966 (from the Seychelles)

References
De Prins, J. & De Prins, W. 2014. Afromoths, online database of Afrotropical moth species (Lepidoptera). Accessed 27 July 2014.

Phycitini
Pyralidae genera